Sponde , also known as , is a natural satellite of Jupiter. It was discovered by a team of astronomers from the University of Hawaii led by Scott S. Sheppard in 2001, and given the temporary designation .

Sponde is about 2 kilometres in diameter, and orbits Jupiter at an average distance of 24,253,000 km in 734.89 days, at an inclination of 154° to the ecliptic (156° to Jupiter's equator), in a retrograde direction and with an eccentricity of 0.443.

It was named in August 2003 after one of the Horae (Hours), which presided over the seventh hour (libations poured after lunch). The Hours, goddesses of the time of day but also of the seasons, were daughters of Zeus (Jupiter) and Themis.

It belongs to the Pasiphae group, irregular retrograde moons orbiting Jupiter at distances ranging between 22.8 and 24.1 Gm, and with inclinations ranging between 144.5° and 158.3°.

References

Pasiphae group
Moons of Jupiter
Irregular satellites
Discoveries by Scott S. Sheppard
Astronomical objects discovered in 2001
Moons with a retrograde orbit